Sean French may refer to:

 Sean French, one half of the writing duo known as Nicci French
 Seán French (1889–1937), Irish Fianna Fáil politician, Teachta Dála (TD) 1927–1932
 Seán French (1931–2011), Irish Fianna Fáil politician, Teachta Dála (TD) 1967–1982
 Seán French (rugby union) (born 1999), Irish rugby union player